Mahadeo Singh (born 1888, date of death unknown) was an Indian long-distance runner. He competed in the marathon at the 1924 Summer Olympics.

References

External links
 

1888 births
Year of death missing
Athletes (track and field) at the 1924 Summer Olympics
Indian male long-distance runners
Indian male marathon runners
Olympic athletes of India
Place of birth missing
Date of birth missing